Kishan H. Hirani (born 2 June 1992) is a Welsh former professional snooker player.

Career
Hirani qualified for his first professional tournament in the 2017 Paul Hunter Classic, winning three matches. He played Chris Wakelin in the first round, but lost 0–4. Having won the third event of the 2018 Q School, he won a two-year tour card for the 2018–19 and 2019–20 snooker seasons, defeating Simon Bedford 4–2.

2018/19 season
In the 2018 Paul Hunter Classic, Hirani qualified for the second round, defeating Jamie Clarke 4–3 in the first round, before losing to Craig Steadman in the second round 0–4. Hirani played in the first round of the 2018 UK Championship, but lost 6–2 to Neil Robertson.

In the summer of 2018, Hirani stated that he intended playing in as many tournaments as possible during his two-year tour card, but that he was seeking a waistcoat sponsor to enable him to do so

Performance and rankings timeline

Career finals

Amateur finals: 1 (1 title)

References

External links

Kishan Hirani at worldsnooker.com

Welsh snooker players
Welsh people of Indian descent
British sportspeople of Indian descent
Living people
1992 births